Cullerin is a small township in the Southern Tablelands of New South Wales, Australia. It is on the Old Hume Highway and Main South railway line in Upper Lachlan Shire. The Cullerin railway station opened in 1880 and closed in 1973.

Transport 

Cullerin is at the summit of a  stretch of ruling grade of the Main Southern Rail line. It lies a few kilometres west of the Great Dividing Range. The Lachlan River and other rivers to the west flow inland, while the Wollondilly River and other rivers to the east flow to the Pacific.

References 

Towns in New South Wales
Southern Tablelands
Localities in New South Wales